Sunwheel Dance is the third studio album by Bruce Cockburn, released in 1972. It was remastered and released by Rounder Records in 2005 with two bonus tracks. For the most part, Cockburn's lyrics here continue to be primarily introspective and spiritual, bolstered by sparse acoustic arrangements. However, Cockburn does make his first foray into political commentary on the anti-war diatribe "Going Down Slow," which also marks the artist's first utilization of a full band on record.  The album has sold steadily through the years, receiving a Canadian gold record award in 1988.

Reception

AllMusic music critic James Chrispell, wrote retrospectively "Cockburn has begun to show that he couldn't be categorized, and while that made listening to his music so enjoyable, he had a hard time at the retail level. But if you're willing to take a little time and listen with an open ear, you'll find much here to celebrate."

Track listing
All songs by Bruce Cockburn
"My Lady and My Lord" - 2:15
"Feet Fall on the Road" - 2:41
"Fall" - 2:58
"Sunwheel Dance" - 1:42
"Up On the Hillside" - 3:00
"Life Will Open" - 4:06
"It's Going Down Slow" - 3:35
"When the Sun Falls" - 2:21
"He Came from the Mountain" - 3:12 
"Dialogue With the Devil (or Why Don't We Celebrate)" -6:20
"For the Birds" - 2:14

2005 bonus tracks
<li>"Morning Hymn" - 2:39
<li>"My Lady and My Lord (Solo Version)" - 2:19

Personnel
Musicians
 Bruce Cockburn - acoustic guitar, electric guitar, dulcimer, mandolin, piano, slide guitar
 Eugene Martynec - piano and electric guitar
 Dennis Pendrith - bass guitar
 John Savage - drums
 Trisha Cullen - accordion
 Ian Guenther - violin
 Carol Marshall - cello
 Eric Nagler - jaw harp
 Michael Ferry, Anne and Mose Scarlett, Eric and Marty Nagler - chorus on "For the Birds"

Production
 Eugene Martynec - producer
 Bill Seddon - engineer at Thunder Sound Studios

References

1972 albums
Bruce Cockburn albums
Albums produced by Gene Martynec
Rounder Records albums